The following highways are numbered 368:

Canada
 Nova Scotia Route 368
 Quebec Route 368
Saskatchewan Highway 368

Hong Kong
Asian Highway 368

Japan
 Japan National Route 368

United States
  Arkansas Highway 368
  Colorado State Highway 368
 Florida:
  Florida State Road 368
 Florida State Road 368 (former)
  County Road 368 (Wakulla County, Florida)
  Georgia State Route 368
  K-368 (Kansas highway)
  Maryland Route 368
  New York State Route 368 (former)
  Ohio State Route 368
  Pennsylvania Route 368
  Puerto Rico Highway 368
  Tennessee State Route 368
  Texas State Highway Loop 368
  Virginia State Route 368